Circlesongs is a 1997 studio album by American vocalist Bobby McFerrin, released by Sony Classical.

In 2018, McFerrin toured with his ensemble the Voicestra, performing material from Circlesongs, as well as improvisational works with audience improvisation encouraged.

The music on the album is performed by "circle singing", an improvisational technique created by McFerrin in 1986. In circle singing, a leader in a circle of singers directs one sub-group in the circle to sing an improvised musical part, and then the leader improvises another part for another sub-group to sing overlayed onto the first part, and so on until the whole circle is singing different improvised parts. The song evolves as the leader changes the improvisation for different groups.

Track listing
"Circlesong One" (6:10)
"Circlesong Two" (4:11)
"Circlesong Three" (4:40)
"Circlesong Four" (4:27)
"Circlesong Five" (5:27)
"Circlesong Six" (7:50)
"Circlesong Seven" (4:57)
"Circlesong Eight" (4:47)

References

1997 albums
Bobby McFerrin albums